The 1998 UEFA Super Cup was a football match that was played on 28 August 1998 at Stade Louis II, Monaco, contested between Champions League winners Real Madrid and Cup Winners' Cup holders Chelsea. Neither team had previously won the trophy. Chelsea won the match 1–0 with a late goal from Gus Poyet.

This was the first Super Cup to be played as a one-off match at a neutral venue. Previously it was played over two legs, although on some occasions, only one match was played, due to special circumstances.

Venue
The Stade Louis II in Monaco was the venue for the UEFA Super Cup for the second time. It was built in 1985, and is also the home of AS Monaco, who play in the French league system. The 1986 European Super Cup match between Steaua București, then holders of the European Cup and Dynamo Kyiv, holders of the UEFA Cup Winners' Cup, took place at the same stadium, in one-leg format.

Teams

Match

Summary
Chelsea's Gus Poyet scored the only goal of the game in the 83rd minute with a right-footed finish from the edge of the penalty area to the right corner of the net after a pass from the left by Gianfranco Zola.

Details

See also
1997–98 UEFA Champions League
1997–98 UEFA Cup Winners' Cup
1971 European Cup Winners' Cup Final – contested between same teams
Chelsea F.C. in international football competitions
Real Madrid CF in international football competitions

References

Super Cup
Super Cup 1998
UEFA Super Cup
UEFA Super Cup 1998
Supercup
1998 in Monégasque sport
August 1998 sports events in Europe
International club association football competitions hosted by Monaco